The Kawuri massacre happened on 26 January 2014 in Kawuri, a village in Konduga Local Government Area, 37 kilometers southeast of Maiduguri in Borno State, northeastern Nigeria. About 50 insurgents attacked civilians with bombs and guns. They burned down houses and kidnapped women. The final death toll was put at 85.

The attackers are believed to be from jihadist group Boko Haram. Their activities in Konduga include a mass shooting in 2013, a massacre in February 2014, battles in 2014 and 2015, as well as suicide bombings in 2018 and 2019.

References 

2014 murders in Nigeria
2014 mass shootings in Africa
2014 murders in Africa
2010s in Borno State
2010s massacres in Nigeria
Arson in Nigeria
Arson in the 2010s
Attacks on buildings and structures in 2014
Attacks on buildings and structures in Nigeria
Boko Haram bombings
Boko Haram kidnappings
Improvised explosive device bombings in 2014
Improvised explosive device bombings in Nigeria
Islamic terrorist incidents in 2014
January 2014 crimes in Africa
January 2014 events in Nigeria
Konduga
Mass murder in Borno State
Mass shootings in Nigeria
Massacres in 2014
Terrorist incidents in Borno State
Terrorist incidents in Nigeria in 2014
Massacres perpetrated by Boko Haram
Attacks in Nigeria in 2014